Saucrobotys futilalis, the dogbane saucrobotys moth, is a moth in the family Crambidae. It was described by Julius Lederer in 1863. It is found in North America, where it has been recorded from the north-east to British Columbia and south to Texas and California.

The length of the forewings is 14–16 mm. Adults are powdery tan to orange, with a faint paler pattern. Adults are on wing from May to July.

The larvae feed on Apocynum (including Apocynum cannabinum) and Asclepias species (including Asclepias tuberosa). They create silken nests on the host plant. The caterpillars also defend against predation by regurgitating the contents of their guts.

Subspecies
Saucrobotys futilalis futilalis (Quebec to Manitoba, Illinois, New Jersey, Pennsylvania)
Saucrobotys futilalis inconcinnalis (Lederer, 1863) (Alberta and British Columbia to California, Arizona, Texas)

References

Moths described in 1863
Pyraustinae
Moths of North America